The Academy of Country Music Award for Album of the Year is a competitive category presented at the Academy of Country Music Awards. The following is the list of winners, with the year representing the nominated work.

Recipients

Category records

Wins 

 Male artist with most wins — George Strait, Chris Stapleton (3).
 Female artist with most wins — Miranda Lambert (5).
 Group with most wins — Alabama (3).
 Duo with the most wins — Brooks & Dunn, Conway Twitty and Loretta Lynn, Glen Campbell and Bobbie Gentry (1).

Nominations 

 Male artist with most nominations — George Strait (12).
 Female artist with most nominations — Miranda Lambert (7).
 Group with most nominations — Alabama (6).
 Duo with the most nominations — Brooks & Dunn (7).

See also 

 Country Music Association Award for Album of the Year

References 

Academy of Country Music Awards
Album awards
Awards established in 1970